Inyokern (formerly Siding 16 and Magnolia) is a census-designated place (CDP) in Kern County, California, United States. Its name derives from its location near the border between Inyo and Kern Counties. It is on the western side of the Indian Wells Valley. The population was 988 in the 2020 census, down from 1,099 in the 2010 census. It was a railroad town established along the Southern Pacific railroad's Lone Pine Branch (now removed). It is served by Inyokern Airport.

Geography
It lies in the Indian Wells Valley, with the eastern slopes of the Sierra Nevada rising to the west.

It is on U.S. Route 395, the main north–south artery connecting the Inland Empire to Reno, Nevada. US 395 also connects Inyokern to Los Angeles via State Route 14 through Palmdale.

State Route 178, the main east–west artery, connects Inyokern to Bakersfield, the county seat, via Lake Isabella in the west, and to Death Valley via Ridgecrest in the east.

Demographics

2010
The 2010 United States Census reported that Inyokern had a population of 1,099. The racial makeup of Inyokern was 930 (84.6%) White, 14 (1.3%) African American, 24 (2.2%) Native American, 25 (2.3%) Asian, 2 (0.2%) Pacific Islander, 49 (4.5%) from other races, and 55 (5.0%) from two or more races. Hispanic or Latino of any race were 116 persons (10.6%).

The Census reported that 1,099 people (100% of the population) lived in households, 0 (0%) lived in non-institutionalized group quarters, and 0 (0%) were institutionalized.

There were 484 households, out of which 111 (22.9%) had children under the age of 18 living in them, 219 (45.2%) were opposite-sex married couples living together, 38 (7.9%) had a female householder with no husband present, 21 (4.3%) had a male householder with no wife present.  There were 29 (6.0%) unmarried opposite-sex partnerships, and 4 (0.8%) same-sex married couples or partnerships. 179 households (37.0%) were made up of individuals, and 73 (15.1%) had someone living alone who was 65 years of age or older. The average household size was 2.27.  There were 278 families (57.4% of all households); the average family size was 3.01.

The population was spread out, with 222 people (20.2%) under the age of 18, 74 people (6.7%) aged 18 to 24, 201 people (18.3%) aged 25 to 44, 406 people (36.9%) aged 45 to 64, and 196 people (17.8%) who were 65 years of age or older.  The median age was 48.2 years. For every 100 females, there were 108.5 males.  For every 100 females age 18 and over, there were 109.8 males.

The homeowner vacancy rate was 1.9%; the rental vacancy rate was 5.7%.  776 people (70.6% of the population) lived in owner-occupied housing units and 323 people (29.4%) lived in rental housing units.

2000
As of the census of 2000, there were 984 people, 418 households, and 270 families residing in the CDP. The racial makeup of the CDP was 87.70% White, 0.41% Black or African American, 4.88% Native American, 2.24% Asian, 1.02% from other races, and 3.76% from two or more races.  6.50% of the population were Hispanic or Latino of any race.

There were 418 households, out of which 25.6% had children under the age of 18 living with them, 52.9% were married couples living together, 8.6% had a female householder with no husband present, and 35.4% were non-families. 31.1% of all households were made up of individuals, and 10.3% had someone living alone who was 65 years of age or older.  The average household size was 2.35 and the average family size was 2.96.

In the CDP, the population was spread out, with 24.2% under the age of 18, 6.7% from 18 to 24, 26.1% from 25 to 44, 30.1% from 45 to 64, and 12.9% who were 65 years of age or older.  The median age was 42 years. For every 100 females, there were 104.1 males.  For every 100 females age 18 and over, there were 102.7 males.

The median income for a household in the CDP was $35,046, and the median income for a family was $41,500. Males had a median income of $50,938 versus $33,889 for females. The per capita income for the CDP was $21,707.  About 10.5% of families and 20.5% of the population were below the poverty line, including 20.6% of those under age 18 and 4.8% of those age 65 or over.

Climate

The climate of Inyokern, California, is predominantly influenced by its high desert location. The climate is characterized by hot days and cool nights with extremely arid conditions prevailing throughout the summer months.

History

Inyokern was founded in the mid-19th century as an agrarian community located in the northernmost corner of the Mojave Desert.  It expanded during construction of the Owens Valley aqueduct. The first post office opened in 1910. The Inyokern Elementary School was founded in 1913. The original building was replaced in the mid-1930s by a larger building with a stage and indoor restrooms. This building was demolished in the early 1970s. In the 1930s, half a dozen irrigated farms were scattered around Indian Wells Valley, growing mostly alfalfa and livestock. Community events were held in Inyokern Hall, which still stands.

With the onset of World War II, the US Navy located its new Naval Air Weapons Station China Lake in Inyokern.  This accounts for the length of the runways and the size of the county airport.  The military base was subsequently moved to the east  and the city of Ridgecrest was established as a commercial support center for that base.

Today Inyokern serves as a sparsely-populated bedroom community for workers on the base desiring a more rural lifestyle.

The town infrastructure consists of two churches, a post office, market and gas station, convenience store and gas station, a variety store, hardware store, welding and blacksmith shop, a county park, two restaurants, a motel, an autobody shop and several antique shops. In the 1990s the building which formerly housed the library was demolished and replaced by a Senior Citizen's Center.  Inyokern also had a now-closed Kern County Sheriff's Office substation and a Caltrans road maintenance center and a motorcycle shop and blanket store.  The town water and sewer system is managed by the Community Services Center.  The population of the town peaked circa 1988 following a period of expansion on the naval base, but has dwindled since then, and many properties were abandoned during the military downsizing of the 1990s.  Until the 1990s, the main commercial block of the town along highway 178 was a somewhat picturesque street of older buildings constructed of local rock and bricks, including a vintage post office, cafe, three bars, and a small Chinese restaurant.  This street is sometimes used in filming Hollywood westerns.  The Inyokern airport is used to film commercials.

Environment

Characterized by extreme aridity, Inyokern is situated in a wide valley at the base of the eastern escarpment of the Sierra Nevada mountain range. The flora of the valley floor consists primarily of Creosote Bush (Larrea tridentata), Burrobush (Ambrosia dumosa), and several varieties of native bunch grasses. The transition zone of the nearby foothills also contain mixtures of pinyon pine, Joshua tree forests, and concentrated riparian habitat surrounding the small streams descending from the mountain peaks. Wildlife ranges from black bear, mountain lion, and whitetail deer in the mountain and transition zones to the kangaroo rat and the endangered desert tortoise on the valley floor. A special note on the local wildlife is the local subspecies of rattlesnake, the Mojave rattlesnake (also called the Mojave green rattlesnake). This snake, which is common in the area, produces  pit viper venom common to the general species but also produces a neuro-toxin that paralyzes the victim within 15 minutes. The subspecies is docile, and fatal bites are rare.

Unique features

Inyokern has the highest insolation of any locale on the North American continent, having over 355 days of sunshine each year.

The town is home to the past and current world champion musical saw players.

The Inyokern Airport is a popular location for car commercials, with the Sierra Nevada Mountains as a backdrop.
Indigenous animals that found in the valley floor are kit foxes, coyotes, bobcats, and roadrunners. Bears and mountain lions occasionally descend from the Sierra Nevada Mountains seeking food.

Transportation

Inyokern Airport
Kern Transit
Eastern Sierra Transit

Notable locations

Inyokern Town Hall
Inyokern Senior Citizens Building

Churches

Bethel Missionary Baptist Church
Inyokern Baptist Church
Inyokern Community Methodist Church

Media

Inyokern is served by two newspapers, The Daily Independent and the News Review, as well as a mixture of local broadcast stations and repeaters from radio and TV stations based in Los Angeles, California. The repeaters are operated by the IWV TV Booster.

AM radio stations

KIRN (670 AM; 35 kW; Simi Valley, CA; Owner: Lotus Oxnard)
KLOA (1240 AM; 1 kW; Ridgecrest, CA; Owner: Adelman Communications)
KLAC (570 AM; 50 kW; Los Angeles, CA; Owner: AMFM Radio Licenses)
KSPN (710 AM; 50 kW; Los Angeles, CA; Owner: KABC-AM Radio)
KWDJ (1360 AM; 1 kW; Ridgecrest, CA)
KMJ (580 AM; 50 kW; Fresno, CA; Owner: Infinity Radio Operations)
KFI (640 AM; 50 kW; Los Angeles, CA; Owner: Capstar TX Limited Partnership)
KPLS (830 AM; 50 kW; Orange, CA; Owner: CRN Licenses)
KFWB (980 AM; 50 kW; Los Angeles, CA; Owner: Infinity Broadcasting Operations)
KDIS (1110 AM; 50 kW; Pasadena, CA; Owner: ABC)
KTNQ (1020 AM; 50 kW; Los Angeles, CA; Owner: KTNQ-AM License Corp.)
KERI (1180 AM; 50 kW; Wasco-Greenacres, CA; Owner: KWSO)
KWRU (940 AM; 50 kW; Fresno, CA)

FM radio stations 
KZIQ-FM (92.7 FM; Ridgecrest, CA; Owner: James Knudsen and Donna Knudsen)
KLOA-FM (104.9 FM; Ridgecrest, CA; Owner: Adelman Communications)
KRAJ (100.9 FM; Johannesburg, CA; Owner: Adelman Broadcasting)
KGBM (89.7 FM; Randsburg, CA; Owner: Educational Media Foundation)
K266AH (101.1 FM; Bena, CA; Owner: Calvary Chapel of Twin Falls)
KTQX (90.1 FM; Bakersfield, CA; Owner: Radio Bilingue)
KMYX-FM (92.5 FM; Arvin, CA; Owner: Farmworker Educational Radio Network)
KKZQ (100.1 FM; Tehachapi, CA; Owner: High Desert Broadcasting)
KVLI-FM (104.5 FM; Lake Isabella, CA; Owner: Robert J. and Katherine M. Bohn)
KCNQ (102.5 FM; Kernville, CA; Owner: Robert J. and Katherine M. Bohn)
K218DU (90.9 FM; Ridgecrest, CA; Owner: Calvary Chapel of Twin Falls)
KCEL (106.9 FM; California City, CA; Owner: KCEL Radio)
K206CO (89.1 FM; Ridgecrest, CA; Owner: Educational Media Foundation)

Notable residents 

 Lorien Stern, artist

References

Census-designated places in Kern County, California
Populated places in the Mojave Desert
Ridgecrest, California
Census-designated places in California